Inguromorpha polybia, the little bark, is a moth in the family Cossidae. It is found in Brazil, Venezuela, Ecuador and Peru.

References

Natural History Museum Lepidoptera generic names catalog

Hypoptinae